Daniel John Howard "Pappy" Wood, Sr. (August 29, 1888 – December 28, 1978) was a Canadian curler.

Wood played ice hockey, lacrosse and soccer (he was a member of the Winnipeg Scottish that won the Canadian Senior soccer championship in 1915) in his youth, but is most notable for his curling achievements.

One of Wood's most notable feats is participating in 71 straight Manitoba Curling Association Bonspiels (1908–1978), setting a Guinness World Record. He won the tournament eight of those 71 times. Wood won his first Brier in 1930, skipping the Manitoba rink which consisted of his brothers Vic (at second) and Lionel (at lead) and third Jim Congalton. The team finished the round robin at a 7–2 record, tied with Alberta. They defeated Alberta, skipped by Bob Munro in the final to claim the Brier.

Wood would win another Brier in 1932, throwing third stones for Congalton. Once again, the team finished tied for first with Alberta after the round robin. Once again, Manitoba prevailed, this time defeating Art Hallonquist's rink.

Wood won his final Brier in 1940, skipping the rink consisting of third Ernie Pollard, his son at second, Howie Wood, Jr., and lead Roy Enman. They finished the round robin undefeated, giving Wood his third Brier trophy, the first person to do so.

Wood would have skipped in his last Brier in 1945, but it was cancelled due to World War II.

Wood is a member of the Canadian Sports Hall of Fame, the Manitoba Sports Hall of Fame and the Canadian Curling Hall of Fame.

Sources
Manitoba Hall of Fame

1888 births
1978 deaths
Curlers from Winnipeg
Manitoba Sports Hall of Fame inductees
Canadian people of Scottish descent
Canadian soccer players
Brier champions
Association footballers not categorized by position